The Lausanne–Echallens–Bercher railway (LEB) G 3/3 2 and 5 is a two member class of metre gauge steam locomotive manufactured by Elsässische Maschinenbau-Gesellschaft Grafenstaden (EMBG) in the village Grafenstaden, entered in service 1888 and 1890.
The preserved example G 3/3 5 Bercher is operational on the Blonay–Chamby museum railway (BC) above Montreux at the Eastern end of Lake Geneva.

No. 2 was named Échallens. It was idled in 1920. Finding no buyer, it was scrapped in 1929.

No. 5 was sold in 1934 to Energie Ouest Suisse (EOS) and was used to haul materials on the construction site of the Dixence Dam. In 1941, she was sold on to the Hilti construction company (nowadays called Hilti & Jehle, in the Austrian state of Vorarlberg).

The Blonay–Chamby museum railway (BC) acquired her in 1973. For her 125th year of operation, the BC invested 125,000CHF in a major overhaul including a new boiler.

Literature 
 Gérald Hadorn und Jean-Louis Rochaix: Voies étroites de la campagne vaudoise, Bureau vaudois d'addresses (BVA), Lausanne 1986,  
 Michel Dehanne, Michel Grandguillaume, Gérald Hadorn, Sébastien Jarne, Anette Rochaix und Jean-Louis Rochaix: Chemins de fer privés vaudois 1873 - 2000, La Raillère, Belmont 2000,  
 Jean-Louis Rochaix, Sébastien Jarne, Gérald Hadorn, Michel Grandguillaume, Michel Dehanne und Anette Rochaix: Chemins de fer privés vaudois 2000 – 2009, 10 ans de modernisation, La Raillère, Belmont 2009,

References 

Preserved steam locomotives of Switzerland
Railway locomotives introduced in 1888
Railway locomotives introduced in 1890
0-6-0 locomotives
Steam locomotives of Switzerland
Metre gauge steam locomotives